Phantasm IV: Oblivion (stylized as Phantasm: OblIVion and also known as Phantasm: Oblivion) is a 1998 American science fantasy horror film. The film was written, produced and directed by Don Coscarelli and starring A. Michael Baldwin, Reggie Bannister and Angus Scrimm. It is the third sequel in the Phantasm series and is followed by Phantasm: Ravager.

Plot
The film begins where the previous film left off. Mike flees from Boulton mortuary in a hearse, while Reggie is trapped inside by the Tall Man's spheres. Rather than kill Reggie, the Tall Man lets him go, saying "the final game now begins." Mike's brother Jody, still a black sphere that can occasionally resume his human form, contacts and persuades Reggie to search for Mike. On the way, Reggie survives a demon attack and rescues a woman named Jennifer from a car accident.  They stay the night at an abandoned motel where Reggie tells her about The Tall Man. Jennifer is not who she seems to be. She attacks Reggie with two spheres, hidden in her breasts. Reggie smashes Jennifer's head and one sphere with a sledgehammer and uses a tuning fork on the other that managed to drill his hand. Mike tries to escape his transformation, driving through abandoned areas, recalling the last days of his youth before The Tall Man's arrival. After being spooked by visions of the elderly Fortune Teller he consulted years ago, the Tall Man appears and declares he is taking Mike somewhere "to prepare for passage." The location is Death Valley where Mike ultimately attempts suicide by hanging. However the Tall Man intercedes and shows him conflicting memories of when he and Jody attempted to kill the Tall Man in 1978. Forbidden from taking his own life, Mike sees the Tall Man offer his hand implying he wants to guide him. Refusing, Mike escapes through a dimension fork. He appears to have traveled back in time, emerging from an early version of the gateway in an 1860s era laboratory. He is greeted by a kind man named Jebediah Morningside. Mike is frightened away because not only does Jebediah appear to be the Tall Man but the Fortune Teller is mysteriously present.

In the desert, Mike realizes he is slowly developing telekinesis when he kills a dwarf with a large boulder. Jody finally appears but a distrustful Mike accuses him of having abandoned him. Mike begins working on the hearse's engine, seemingly using parts to build a makeshift sphere. Mike goes through a gate, but finds himself in a deserted city and escapes The Tall Man only with Jody's help. Meanwhile, Reggie arrives at Death Valley and fights off a group of dwarfs shortly before Mike and Jody reappear through a gate.  Mike embraces Reggie and tells him not to trust Jody. Mike and Jody pass through the gate and appear in Jebediah's house.  Invisible to the old man, they witness how he perfects his craft and approaches the inter-dimensional gate.  Mike unsuccessfully tries to stab Jebediah, who vanishes and moments later is replaced by the Tall Man incarnation who emerges in his place. He can see Jody and Mike, forcing Mike to retreat through the gate. Jody finds Mike in a cemetery and attacks him. Awakening on an embalming slab, Mike uses the tuning fork to immobilize Jody and the Tall Man as they attempt to cut open his head with a buzz saw equipped sphere. He makes the Tall Man kill Jody with the still-running saw. The Tall Man quickly revives and telekinetically takes the fork from Mike. Again, Mike escapes through the gate back to Death Valley, this time pursued by his nemesis.

Reggie tries to shoot but is overpowered by The Tall Man. Mike then summons the sphere he built and uses it to impale The Tall Man in the neck. At this moment, Mike activates the hearse's motor, which turns out to be the true weapon, a strange inter-dimensional bomb, against the Tall Man. The Tall Man is once again supposedly vanquished. However, a new Tall Man immediately comes through the gate, revealing that The Tall Man is but one of many. The Tall Man removes the golden sphere from Mike's head and then passes through the gate. Reggie arms himself and chases after The Tall Man through the gate. Mike recalls a childhood memory of him climbing into Reggie's ice cream truck as they both drive off into the dark night. Oddly enough, both of them hear each other's last exchange of dialogue from the present before Reggie went through the gate. Reggie asks Mike if he hears the voice, but Mike brushes it off, declaring "it's just the wind."

Cast
 Angus Scrimm as The Tall Man
 A. Michael Baldwin as Mike Pearson
 Reggie Bannister as Reggie
 Bill Thornbury as Jody Pearson
 Bob Ivy as Demon Trooper
 Heidi Marnhout as Jennifer

Production and sequel
Canadian filmmaker Roger Avary, a self-professed hardcore fan of the Phantasm series, wrote an epic screenplay titled "Phantasm 1999 A.D." as a sequel to Phantasm III: Lord of the Dead. It was set in a post-apocalyptic near future and would feature Bruce Campbell as a co-star. As the project ran into financing difficulties, Don Coscarelli wrote and directed this fourth installment as a precursor to the project, using numerous outtakes from the preceding films. Avary also appeared in the film as one of the Civil War soldiers. Despite these efforts, the budget for the sequel, now retitled Phantasm's End, could not be secured.

Oblivion'''s budget was considerably lower than the previous two Phantasm films. While Phantasm II had a budget of $3,000,000 and Phantasm III: Lord of the Dead had a budget of $2,500,000, the filmmakers were only able to secure $650,000 to make Phantasm IV: Oblivion. The filmmakers had to be inventive with the budget, much like the first film, which had only $300,000 budget. For the Civil War dream sequence a Civil War reenactment group was hired in exchange for a $200 donation. Because the production could afford to build only a few sets, several key scenes were filmed in the desert, making this the only Phantasm movie without significant scenes inside a mausoleum setting, except the very beginning and toward the end. The swarm of spheres was done by several fans of Phantasm, who then showed it to Bannister who, in turn, showed it to Coscarelli. KNB EFX group also helped out a bit on the film as a favor to Coscarelli.

Rumors of a sequel were reignited in June 2007 by footage contained in Don Coscarelli's Farewell to The Alamo Drafthouse, featuring Angus Scrimm and A. Michael Baldwin in their roles. However, in an interview with Reggie Bannister that surfaced on YouTube, Bannister stated there was no activity or development involving a fifth installment but that anything was possible in the future.

On March 25, 2014, it was announced that a fifth installment in the series, Phantasm: Ravager'', had been filmed secretly. The film was released on October 7, 2016.

DVD release
The film was released on Video in 1998 and on DVD in 2000, both by MGM Home Entertainment. In 2008, Anchor Bay Entertainment released a special edition of the film. News reports said it would be the uncut version, however, the special edition contains only the R-rated version (as did the MGM release).

References

External links

 
 

1998 direct-to-video films
Direct-to-video sequel films
Films directed by Don Coscarelli
Orion Pictures films
American supernatural horror films
1998 horror films
1998 films
Grave-robbing in film
Metro-Goldwyn-Mayer direct-to-video films
Phantasm (franchise)
1990s English-language films
1990s American films